Jan Muzangu (born 31 May 2000) is a Swiss footballer who plays as a midfielder for Rapperswil-Jona in the Swiss Promotion League.

Club career

Chennai City
Muzangu penned a deal for loan transfer for I-League side Chennai City F.C. and made his first appearance against East Bengal F.C. whereby they suffered a loss of 0–2. On February 9, 2020 he scored his first goal for Chennai City against Churchill Brothers S.C. and won the contest by 2–1.

Black Stars Basel
In 2021, Muzangu signed with Swiss Promotion League side Black Stars Basel.

References

2000 births
Footballers from Basel
21st-century Democratic Republic of the Congo people
Swiss people of Democratic Republic of the Congo descent
Swiss sportspeople of African descent
Living people
Swiss men's footballers
Association football midfielders
FC Concordia Basel players
FC Basel players
Chennai City FC players
FC Black Stars Basel players
FC Rapperswil-Jona players
Swiss Promotion League players
I-League players
Swiss expatriate footballers
Expatriate footballers in India
Swiss expatriate sportspeople in India